Anjad tehsil is a fourth-order administrative and revenue division, a subdivision of third-order administrative and revenue division of Barwani district of Madhya Pradesh.

Geography
Anjad tehsil has an area of 15.54 sq kilometers. It is bounded by Dhar district in the northwest and north, Thikri tehsil in the northeast and east, Rajpur tehsil in the southeast, south and southwest and Barwani tehsil in the west.

See also 
Barwani district

Citations

External links

Tehsils of Madhya Pradesh
Barwani district